Kungla may refer to:

Kungla, Lääne-Saare Parish, village in Lääne-Saare Parish, Saare County, Estonia
Kungla, Valjala Parish, village in Valjala Parish, Saare County, Estonia
Korporatsioon Kungla, fraternal organization of Estonian higher education students, operated from 1924 to 1927.
Kungla tänav, popular streetname in Estonia